Panagitsa is a community in the municipal unit of Levidi, northern Arcadia, Greece. It is situated at the edge of a wide valley, at 540 m elevation. It is 3 km west of Chotoussa, 5 km southeast of Dara, 6 km east of Prasino and 12 km northwest of Levidi. The Greek National Road 33 (Patras - Tripoli) passes through the village.

Historical population

Culture
Panagitsa Folklore Museum

See also
List of settlements in Arcadia

External links
University of Patras on Panagitsa
GTP - Panagitsa

References

Populated places in Arcadia, Peloponnese